Våland is a neighborhood (delområde) in the city of Stavanger which lies in the southwestern part of the large municipality of Stavanger in Rogaland county, Norway. It is located in the borough of Eiganes og Våland. It is located to the south part of central Stavanger—east of Mosvatnet lake.

History
Våland was populated around the 18th century. Before today's tower was built, there supposedly stood a watchtower at the area. It was called Vålandspibå, a name still used for the tower.

References

Boroughs and neighbourhoods of Stavanger